Money Marketing is a monthly magazine for financial intermediaries in the United Kingdom. The team of journalists work across print publication and online to deliver a combination of breaking news, analysis, opinion, podcasts and videos to their audience of professional financial advisers. The magazine was established in 1985 and is owned by Metropolis Group. The editor is Katey Pigden and the current editorial team consists of Michael Klimes as news editor, Maria Merricks as features editor, Amanda Newman-Smith as features writer, Lois Vallely as Chief Reporter, Momodou Musa Touray and Jean-Baptiste Andrieux as reporters.

Industry awards 
Santander personal finance trade/professional website of the year: 2012, 2013 and 2015

Santander personal finance trade/professional title of the year: 2015, 2016 

Headlinemoney personal finance trade publication of the year: 2003, 2004, 2005, 2007, 2009, 2010, 2011, 2012, 2013, 2014 and 2016

Headlinemoney best use of social media: 2012, 2013 and 2014

Bradford & Bingley/Santander personal finance trade/professional publication of the year: 2006, 2007, 2010, 2011 and 2013

Santander personal finance best use of social media: 2013

ABI trade publication of the year: 2001, 2002, 2004, 2005 and 2008

References

External links
http://www.moneymarketing.co.uk/

1985 establishments in the United Kingdom
Business newspapers published in the United Kingdom
Publications established in 1985